Neverkusen and its German equivalent Vizekusen ("second-kusen") are nicknames for German football team Bayer 04 Leverkusen. Both apply to the runners-up image of the team, which from 2000–2002 often found its way into finals but never to the top.

Bayer, the company owning the team, has issued a trademark on Vizekusen and others which the German Financial Times has claimed as proof of a Bayer marketing strategy to use the ironic elements.

The expressions have had various echoes in the press. In case of Bayern Munich's three final losses in the Champions League, Bundesliga and DFB-Pokal in 2012, the press used expressions like "Vizekusen-Syndrome", "Vizekusen 2.0.", or Vizekusen-stigmata and a fear of having them stuck.

Some concerns about a Vizekusen curse were raised before the 2002 World Cup and Euro 2012 as an important number of players in the national team came from Leverkusen or Bayern respectively.

References 

Bayer 04 Leverkusen
Sports-related curses